This is a list of films produced in Albania by the decade.

Films by decade
 Films of the 1950s
 Films of the 1960s
 Films of the 1970s
 Films of the 1980s
 Films of the 1990s
 Films of the 2000s
 Films of the 2010s
 Films of the 2020s

See also
 National Center of Cinematography
 Central State Film Archive
 Cinema of Kosovo

External links
 Albanian film at the Internet Movie Database